Pemberton Heights is an unincorporated community and census-designated place (CDP) located within Pemberton Township, in Burlington County, New Jersey, United States. As of the 2010 United States Census, the CDP's population was 2,423.

Geography
According to the United States Census Bureau, the CDP had a total area of 0.937 square miles (2.427 km2), including 0.937 square miles (2.426 km2) of land and 0.000 square miles (0.001 km2) of water (0.05%).

Demographics

Census 2010

Census 2000
As of the 2000 United States Census there were 2,512 people, 1,072 households, and 633 families living in the CDP. The population density was 1,042.9/km2 (2,699.7/mi2). There were 1,098 housing units at an average density of 455.8/km2 (1,180.0/mi2). The racial makeup of the CDP was 41.80% White, 46.38% African American, 0.12% Native American, 3.82% Asian, 0.00% Pacific Islander, 4.10% from other races, and 3.78% from two or more races. 11.58% of the population were Hispanic or Latino of any race.

There were 1,072 households, out of which 19.0% had children under the age of 18 living with them, 42.9% were married couples living together, 12.2% had a female householder with no husband present, and 40.9% were non-families. 33.7% of all households were made up of individuals, and 5.8% had someone living alone who was 65 years of age or older. The average household size was 2.34 and the average family size was 3.05.

In the CDP the population was spread out, with 18.8% under the age of 18, 10.0% from 18 to 24, 30.8% from 25 to 44, 25.8% from 45 to 64, and 14.6% who were 65 years of age or older. The median age was 38 years. For every 100 females, there were 100.5 males. For every 100 females age 18 and over, there were 97.2 males.

The median income for a household in the CDP was $43,274, and the median income for a family was $60,536. Males had a median income of $32,319 versus $26,853 for females. The per capita income for the CDP was $24,716. 6.6% of the population and 3.8% of families were below the poverty line. 9.6% of those under the age of 18 and 3.4% of those 65 and older were living below the poverty line.

References

Census-designated places in Burlington County, New Jersey
Pemberton Township, New Jersey
Populated places in the Pine Barrens (New Jersey)